The Men's 10 metre air rifle event took place on 25 July 2014 at the Barry Buddon Shooting Centre. There was a qualification to determine the participants in the finals.

Results

Qualification

Finals

References

External links
Schedule of events at 2014 Commonwealth games-Glasgow 

Shooting at the 2014 Commonwealth Games